para-Nitroblebbistatin is a non-phototoxic, photostable myosin inhibitor with low fluorescence. Its myosin inhibitory properties are very similar to those of blebbistatin.

Myosin specificity

Applications 
para-Nitroblebbistatin has been successfully used in fluorescent imaging experiments involving myosin IIA-GFP expressing live dendritic cells and synaptophysin-pHluorin expressing live neurons.

References 

Imaging
Tertiary alcohols
Nitrogen heterocycles
Ketones
Nitro compounds
Heterocyclic compounds with 3 rings